Edward Barbeau  is a  Canadian mathematician and a Canadian Mathematical Educator. He is a Professor Emeritus at the University of Toronto Department of Mathematics.

Awards
 Fellowship of the Ontario Institute for Studies in Education.
  David Hilbert Award  from the World Federation of National Mathematics Competitions.
 Adrien Pouliot Award from the Canadian Mathematical Society.
 Inaugural fellow of the Canadian Mathematical Society, 2018

References

External links
 

Edward J. Barbeau archival papers held at the University of Toronto Archives and Records Management Services

Living people
Canadian mathematicians
Mathematics educators
Mathematics popularizers
Academic staff of the University of Toronto
Year of birth missing (living people)
Fellows of the Canadian Mathematical Society